This is list of albums that have been certified Gold, Platinum, and Diamond by Music Canada. Certification is based on the following table:

Gold

0304
21 at 33
A Night to Remember
Ace Frehley
Agents of Fortune
The Album
Alive III
Alive!
All Jacked Up
All Shook Up
All Things Must Pass
All You Can Eat
American Gangster
American Saturday Night
Angel Clare
Asylum
Attack & Release
A Year Without Rain
Bananaphone
Bare
Better Be Home Soon
Black Butterfly
Blonde
Blue Moves
Born to Fly
Box Car Racer
Brainwashed
Brave New World
British Steel
Brushfire Fairytales
Buckcherry
Burlesque
Busted
Ceremonials
Chaos and Creation in the Backyard
Charmbracelet
Chickenfoot
Come What(ever) May
The Concert in Central Park
Curb
Currents
Dangerous Acquaintances
Dark Sky Island
Death of a Bachelor
Debut
Deftones
Disclaimer II
Dive
The Don Killuminati: The 7 Day Theory
Double Live Gonzo!
Double Platinum
Dreaming of You
Dreaming Out Loud
Eagles Live
Echo
Endgame
Escapology
Evanescence
Everywhere We Go
Faceless
Fear Inoculum
Feeling Strangely Fine
Finding Beauty in Negative Spaces
Fire of Unknown Origin
Flowers in the Dirt
The Foundation
Free-for-All
Gene Simmons
Get Closer
Get Happy!!
Godsmack
God's Son
Going Back
Good News for People Who Love Bad News
Graffiti Bridge
Greatest Hits
Greatest Hits
The Greyest of Blue Skies
Harem
Her Greatest Hits: Songs of Long Ago
Hesitation Marks
Hit and Run
Holy Wood (In the Shadow of the Valley of Death)
Hooked
Horizon
Horse of a Different Color
The House of Blue Light
I Care 4 U
If You See Him
Illmatic
Innuendo
Inside Job
Introducing Joss Stone
Irresistible
It's Not Me, It's You
It Was Written
Joy to the World
Karma and Effect
Kiss
Kiss Symphony: Alive IV
Kiss & Tell
Last of the Ghetto Astronauts
Led Zeppelin Boxed Set
Les chemins de ma maison
Lick It Up
Life Is Peachy
Lights and Sounds
The Listening
Live: Right Here, Right Now
Lonerism
Lotus
Love Always
Love on the Inside
Love Sensuality Devotion: The Greatest Hits
Lungs
Machina/The Machines of God
Melt
Mélanie
Memory Almost Full
Milk and Honey
Modern Day Drifter
My Aim Is True
My Kinda Party
Musicology
Nastradamus
Neon Bible
Now for Plan A
Now or Never
Au cœur du stade
Ocean Avenue
Off the Ground
Old World Underground, Where Are You Now?
On and On
Once Bitten
Painkiller
Part II
Paul Stanley
Peter Criss
Pinkerton
Plastic Beach
Playing the Angel
Poses
Pray for the Wicked
Pretty Hate Machine
Priest...Live!
Psalm 69: The Way to Succeed and the Way to Suck Eggs
Psycho Circus
Ram It Down
The Red Shoes
Release the Stars
Reptile
Reveal
Revenge
Royal Blood
Say You Will
Scream Dream
The Screen Behind the Mirror
See You on the Other Side
SempiternalThe Sensual WorldSimply DeepSmile and WaveSoul Searchin'Songs from the West CoastThe Sound of MadnessState of ShockSticks and StonesStill I RiseStillmaticStorm in the HeartlandStreet's DiscipleStrongerSymphonyTailgates & TanlinesTalk on CornersTangoTed NugentTeeth and TissueThat's the SpiritThis Year's ModelTime Well WastedTitle of RecordToo Weird to Live, Too Rare to Die!TorchesTwice the Speed of LifeTwisted AngelUnder the Desert SkyUnmaskedThe Very Best of PrinceVesselVol. 3... Life and Times of S. CarterVulgar Display of PowerWatermarkWe Were Dead Before the Ship Even SankWhat My Heart Already KnowsWhatever and Ever AmenWhen the Sun Goes DownWhite PonyWho Needs PicturesThe Whole StoryWild LifeA Winter SymphonyWolfgang Amadeus PhoenixWorking Class Hero: The Definitive LennonYou Get What You GiveYou're a Woman, I'm a MachineThe Youth of TodayPlatinum10,000 Days (Tool album)15 (Buckcherry album)1999 (Prince album)808s & HeartbreakÀ l'OlympiaÆnimaAerial (album)A Fever You Can't Sweat OutAlanis (album)Alive IIAll Eyez on MeAll I Ever Wanted (album)Amore (Andrea Bocelli album)Andrea (Andrea Bocelli album)AnimalizeAppeal to ReasonAria: The Opera AlbumArmed Forces (album)ArtpopAwake (Godsmack album)B'DayBack to BlackBelieve (Disturbed album)Belinda (Belinda Carlisle album)The Best of Andrea Bocelli: VivereThe Best of SadeThe Big Picture (Elton John album)The Black Album (Jay-Z album)The Black ParadeBlack Sabbath Vol. 4Bleed AmericanThe BlueprintThe Blueprint 3Bounce (Bon Jovi album)Bridges to BabylonBroken (Nine Inch Nails EP)Broken English (album)But Seriously, Folks...C'mon, C'monCat Scratch FeverCheek to Cheek (album)Chuck (Sum 41 album)The Circle (Bon Jovi album)Classics (Sarah Brightman album)The College DropoutCome On Over (Olivia Newton-John album)The Concert (Barbra Streisand album)Crazy NightsDamita Jo (album)Dangerously in LoveDay & AgeDefenders of the FaithDefying Gravity (Keith Urban album)Dirt (Alice in Chains album)Diver DownThe DocumentaryDoo-Wops & HooligansThe Dream of the Blue TurtlesEden (Sarah Brightman album)The Ego Has LandedEmancipation (Prince album)Endgame (Rise Against album)Elvis' Golden RecordsEverything NowEye to the TelescopeFair Warning (Van Halen album)Fantasies (album)Far Beyond DrivenFeels Like TodayFemme Fatale (Britney Spears album)Finger Eleven (album)For Unlawful Carnal KnowledgeFreedom (Akon album)Get It on CreditGhost Stories (Coldplay album)Girls' Night Out (Toronto album)Grace Under Pressure (Rush album)The Greatest Hits (Cher album)Greatest Hits (Reba McEntire album)Greatest Hits (Tupac Shakur album)Greatest Hits, Etc.Greatest Hits: 18 KidsGreen (R.E.M. album)Hail to the King (Avenged Sevenfold album)Have a Nice Day (Bon Jovi album)Head On (Toronto album)Heaven TonightHere for the PartyHold Your FireHot FussHot in the ShadeHounds of LoveHow the West Was Won (Led Zeppelin album)Hymns of the 49th ParallelI Am... (Nas album)I Look to YouI Need You (album)The Id (album)In Color (album)Indestructible (Disturbed album)Iowa (album)Is This ItIt's Your CallJanet Jackson's Rhythm Nation 1814JoJo (album)Journeyman (album)The Kick InsideThe Last TemptationLady Antebellum (album)Lap of LuxuryLeAnn Rimes (album)Lennon Legend: The Very Best of John LennonLife Starts NowLionheart (Kate Bush album)Live It OutLookin' for TroubleLove Hurts (Cher album)Love Songs: A Compilation... Old and NewLove, Pain & the Whole Crazy ThingLa Luna (Sarah Brightman album)Made in HeavenMagna Carta Holy GrailMake BelieveMe and My GangMechanical AnimalsThe Memory of TreesMendedMercury FallingMetals (album)Music from the Edge of HeavenMy DecemberNever for EverNevermindA New FlameNightmare (Avenged Sevenfold album)No Fixed AddressNo Line on the HorizonNon-Stop Erotic Cabaret...Nothing Like the SunThe Nylon CurtainOff the Wall (album)One of These NightsOut of the Blue (Electric Light Orchestra album)Own the NightPeace (Eurythmics album)Perfect Strangers (album)Picture of HealthPipes of PeacePlanet PitPlay On (Carrie Underwood album)Power Windows (album)Prism (Prism album)Quelqu'un m'a ditRacine carréeRam (album)RecoveryRed Rose SpeedwayReturn of SaturnRevivalRise and Fall, Rage and GraceRock of the WestiesRock Steady (album)Le Roi est mort, vive le Roi!Rule 3:36Runaway Horses (album)Savage (Eurythmics album)Screaming for VengeanceSee Forever EyesSentimentoShaking the Tree: Sixteen Golden GreatsA Show of HandsThe SicknessA Single Man (album)Siren Song of the Counter CultureSittin' on Top of the World (LeAnn Rimes album)Slipknot (album)Smashes, Thrashes & HitsSmells Like ChildrenSmoke + MirrorsSongs of Faith and DevotionSoul (Seal album)The Soul CagesThe Soul SessionsSpirit (Leona Lewis album)The StateStill Crazy After All These YearsStill Waters (Bee Gees album)Stronger Than PrideThe Sufferer & the WitnessSyntheticaTaylor Swift (album)Tellement j'ai d'amour...Ten Summoner's TalesTen Thousand FistsThank Me LaterThankful (Kelly Clarkson album)Them vs. You vs. MeThree Cheers for Sweet RevengeThree Days Grace (album)To the SeaToo Low for ZeroTraveling Wilburys Vol. 3TrenchTurbo (Judas Priest album)Turn BlueU218 SinglesUnchained Melody: The Early YearsUnder Rug SweptUnderdogs (album)Undertow (Tool album)Vol. 2... Hard Knock LifeVenus and MarsVerdi (album)Very (Pet Shop Boys album)The Very Best of CherThe Very Best of Fleetwood MacViaggio ItalianoVol. 3: (The Subliminal Verses)Watch the ThroneWeekend Warriors (album)Weezer (Green Album)Wings GreatestWith TeethWorking on a DreamThe Works (Queen album)Multi-platinum

Two times21st Century BreakdownAdoreA Head Full of DreamsAnimal (Kesha album)Antichrist SuperstarAquarius (Aqua album)Armageddon (Prism album)As I AmAwake (Josh Groban album)Back to the EggBe HereBedtime Stories (Madonna album)Best Of – Volume IBeautiful MidnightThe Blueprint 2: The Gift & The CurseBrand New Day (Sting album)By the WayCieli di ToscanaCollision CourseThe Cross of ChangesCrush (Bon Jovi album)D'ellesDiamond LifeDiamonds and PearlsDion chante PlamondonDiva (Annie Lennox album)Doo-Wops & HooligansDynasty (Kiss album) The End of the Innocence (Don Henley album)EvolveFever (Kylie Minogue album)The FragileFrom Under the Cork TreeFuneral (Arcade Fire album)Ghost Stories (Coldplay album)Golden Road (album)Graduation (album)Greatest Hits (Guns N' Roses album)Greatest Hits Volume Two (Reba McEntire album)Heaven on Earth (Belinda Carlisle album)Here and Now (Nickelback album)Highway to HellI Am... Sasha FierceIncognito(Celine Dion album)Ingénue (album)Issues (Korn album)It Won't Be the LastIxnay on the HombreJ.Lo (album)Late RegistrationLateralusLegend (Bob Marley & The Wailers album)Live After DeathLive à ParisLoud (Rihanna album)Made in England (Elton John album)Marc Anthony (album)MCMXC a.D.Medusa (Annie Lennox album)Most Wanted (Hilary Duff album)My Love: Essential CollectionNew Adventures in Hi-FiNothing But The BeatA New World RecordOlder (album)One Love (David Guetta album)One-XOral Fixation Vol. 2Parachutes (Coldplay album)PCD (album)The Phantom of the Opera (1986 musical)Piece of MindPowerslaveReg Strikes BackReLoadRevenge (Eurythmics album)The Rhythm of the SaintsRock 'n Soul Part 1The Seeds of LoveThe Singles 1992–2003Sleeping with the PastThe Slim Shady LP(Songbook) A Collection of HitsSorry for Party RockingStorm Front (album)The Suburbs (album)The Sweet EscapeThese Days (Bon Jovi album)Toto IVToxicity (album)True Colors (Cyndi Lauper album)Tubular Bells...Twice ShyUntil the End of TimeUs (Peter Gabriel album)Van Halen IIThe Very Best Of (Eagles album)Violator (album)Vuelve (album)We Sing. We Dance. We Steal Things.Who Are YouWomen and Children FirstYou Light Up My Life: Inspirational SongsThree times5150 (album)All SaintsBack to BasicsBalance (Van Halen album)Barbra Streisand's Greatest Hits Vol. 2BatmanThe Best of 1990–2000Better DayzBilly TalentBilly Talent IIBlue (LeAnn Rimes album)Born This WayBritney (album)Brothers (The Black Keys album)Circus (Britney Spears album)Discovery (Electric Light Orchestra album)The Downward SpiralDream PoliceThe Emancipation of MimiFollow the Leader (Korn album)Funhouse (Pink album)Greatest Hits (Eurythmics album)Greatest Hits (Queen album)In Between DreamsInto the Fire (album)An Innocent ManThe MassacreMylo XylotoMystery GirlNeed You NowThe Number of the Beast (album)On How Life IsOn ne change pasOne HeartThe One (Elton John album)Pain Is LoveReflektorRiver of DreamsSans attendreShakin' Like a Human BeingShepherd MoonsSheryl Crow (album)Some Hearts (Carrie Underwood album)Speak NowStrippedTeenage Dream (Katy Perry album)Time to Say GoodbyeTuesday Night Music ClubUnder the MistletoeVagabond HeartWatermark (Enya album)WintersongFour times52nd Street (album)AdrenalizeBlurryfaceBridge Over Troubled WaterBorn This Way (album)Crazy Love (Michael Bublé album)El Camino (The Black Keys album)Enema of the StateFearless (Taylor Swift album)Red (Taylor Swift album)Greatest Hits (Bruce Springsteen album)Heart of Stone (Cher album)Loved Me Back to LifeThe Marshall Mathers LP 2Metamorphosis (Hilary Duff album)No AngelOnly by the NightParallel LinesPearl (Janis Joplin album)A Rush of Blood to the HeadSiamese DreamSign o' the TimesS'il suffisait d'aimerSupposed Former Infatuation JunkieTaking ChancesVan Halen (album)Weezer (Blue Album)Five times1100 Bel Air Place1984 (Van Halen album)8 Mile: Original SoundtrackBreakaway (Kelly Clarkson album)Cheap Trick at BudokanELV1SEscape (Enrique Iglesias album)Forty LicksGlass HousesGuilty (Barbra Streisand album)I Dreamed a Dream (album)Laundry ServiceA Little Bit of MamboThe Long RoadLove. Angel. Music. Baby.The Razors Edge (AC/DC album)SognoSongs in A MinorSpirits Having FlownTango in the NightUnder My Skin (Avril Lavigne album)The Very Best of Sheryl CrowViva la Vida or Death and All His FriendsWhen We All Fall Asleep, Where Do We Go?X&YSix timesA New Day Has ComeBelieve (Cher album)The Best of 1980–1990Christina AguileraConfessions (Usher album)Dangerous (Michael Jackson album)Dark HorseGreatest Hits (Shania Twain album)In UteroMake It BigMonster (R.E.M. album)Purple RainSo Far So Good (Bryan Adams album)Traveling Wilburys Vol. 1Five Days in July1989 (Taylor Swift album)Seven timesAll the Right ReasonsAutomatic for the PeopleD'euxFallen (Evanescence album)The FameHell Freezes OverThe Immaculate CollectionNight VisionsPyromania (Def Leppard album)UnisonTenEight timesA Day Without RainGet Rich or Die Tryin'The Marshall Mathers LPSgt. Pepper's Lonely Hearts Club BandSilver Side UpShe's So Unusual(What's the Story) Morning Glory?Nine timesLed Zeppelin IIUse Your Illusion IIDiamond1 (The Beatles album)1962–196621 (Adele album)25 (Adele album)All the Way... A Decade of SongAmericana (The Offspring album)Appetite for DestructionAquarium (Aqua album)...Baby One More TimeBack in BlackBackstreet BoysBackstreet's BackBorn in the U.S.A.Breakfast in AmericaBrothers in Arms (Dire Straits album)Celine Dion (album)The Colour of My LoveCross RoadDirty Dancing (soundtrack)The Eminem ShowFalling into YouGold: Greatest Hits (ABBA album) Hotel California (album)Hysteria (Def Leppard album)Led Zeppelin (album)Let's Talk About LoveLike a VirginMellon Collie and the Infinite SadnessMetallica (album)MillenniumNevermindReckless (Bryan Adams album)RomanzaRicky Martin (second eponymous album, 1999)Saturday Night Fever: SoundtrackSome Gave AllSavage Garden (Savage Garden album)SpiceSpiceworldSupernatural (Santana album)These Are Special TimesThe Joshua TreeTragic KingdomTrue Blue (Madonna album)Unplugged (Eric Clapton album)Use Your Illusion IWaking Up the NeighboursDouble diamond21Bat Out of HellCome On OverThe Dark Side of the MoonJagged Little PillLed Zeppelin IVRumoursUp!Their Greatest Hits (1971-1975)The WallThe Woman in MeTriple diamondThriller''

See also
List of diamond-certified albums in Canada
List of music recording certifications

References

External links
 Music Canada Website

Lists of best-selling albums
Music recording certifications